Trochus zhangi is a species of sea snail, a marine gastropod mollusk in the family Trochidae, the top snails.

Description

Distribution

References

 Dong Z. Z. (2002) Fauna Sinica Invertebrata, vol. 29. Science Press, Beijing. 210 pp

zhangi
Gastropods described in 2002